is a 2016 Japanese drama film directed by , starring Takeru Satoh and Aoi Miyazaki and based on the novel Sekai kara Neko ga Kieta nara by . It was released in Japan by Toho on May 14, 2016.

Plot
An unnamed young man, living alone and working as a postman, is given a terminal diagnosis of brain cancer. As he despairs and wonders who will miss him when he dies, he returns home to find a doppelganger of himself, who claims to be the devil. The "devil" tells the man that if he agrees that one type of thing, chosen by the devil, will be removed from the world (as if it had never been), then the man can have another day of life instead of dying the next day. The items are removed at the end of that day, giving the man one last day ostensibly to enjoy them before they disappear from the world. The story proceeds through successive days with new things being removed each day: after phones, then movies, clocks, and finally cats. The story focuses on the way in which the world is different for the man and his backstory without the removed items. Each of these is somehow crucial to his relationships with his few friends and family: an ex-girlfriend, a best friend who only knows how to interact with others through sharing movies, an acquaintance met in Buenos Aires, and most importantly, the man's late mother, whose cat he inherited. The story is told both in the present and in a series of flashbacks, and the viewer comes to have a better understanding of the young man's relationships with family and friends, and the pain and beauty of mortality.

Cast
Takeru Satoh
Aoi Miyazaki
Gaku Hamada

Anna Ishii
Eiji Okuda
Mieko Harada

Reception

See Also
The lyrics of "Fantasou Apla" by Greek artist Despina Vandi also suggest imagining a world where a class of items disappears one at a time, and focuses on how the world would differ each time, as a means of revealing the importance of a relationship vanishing.

References

External links
 

Films based on Japanese novels
Toho films
Japanese drama films
Films with screenplays by Yoshikazu Okada
2016 drama films
2010s Japanese films